Gunnar Bragi Sveinsson (born 9 June 1968) is an Icelandic politician for the Center Party.

He is a member of the Althingi (Iceland's parliament) for the Centre Party for the Northwest of Iceland constituency since 2017. He was the Chairman of the Progressive Party 2009–2013. On 23 May 2013, Gunnar Bragi was appointed the Minister for Foreign Affairs. In 2017, he joined the Centre Party formed by his close friend Sigmundur Davíð Gunnlaugsson and ran for party in the 2017 elections. He is currently Chairman of the Center Party parliamentary group.

References

External links 
Biography of Gunnar Bragi Sveinsson on the parliament website

1968 births
Gunnar Bragi Sveinsson
Living people
Gunnar Bragi Sveinsson
Gunnar Bragi Sveinsson